Glenea matangensis is a species of beetle in the family Cerambycidae. It was described by Per Olof Christopher Aurivillius in 1911. It is known from Borneo, Malaysia and Brunei. It contains the variety Glenea matangensis var. rufimembris.

References

matangensis
Beetles described in 1911